Vladimirea zygophyllivorella is a moth in the family Gelechiidae. It was described by Vladimir Ivanovitsch Kuznetsov in 1960. It is found in Turkmenistan.

References

Vladimirea
Moths described in 1960